The Navajo Language Academy (NLA; Navajo Diné Bizaad Naalkaah) is a non-profit educational and advocacy organization which focuses on the Navajo language.

Overview
The NLA organizes efforts of linguists and language instructors to train teachers of Navajo. Summer workshops on the Navajo language, applied linguistics, and general linguistics have been offered every summer since 1997. Undergraduate-level courses are offered for college credit.

The NLA differs from such related organizations as the Navajo Nation Division of Diné Education, Diné College, and the Navajo Language Teachers Association in focusing on scientific research on the Navajo language and on teaching Navajo people, especially language teachers, how to carry out linguistic research and to use existing reference materials.

The Board of Directors of the NLA includes Navajo linguist Ellavina Perkins.

The NLA maintains a comprehensive bibliography on Navajo linguistics, available on its web site, and holds the archive of the Navajo material of linguist Ken Hale.

External links
Navajo Language Academy web site

Navajo language
Native American schools